Yquebeuf is a commune in the Seine-Maritime department in the Normandy region in northern France.

Geography
The A28 autoroute passes through the territory of the commune.

Heraldry

Population

Places of interest
 The church of St. Etienne, dating from the eighteenth century.
 The church of St. Laurent, dating from the seventeenth century.

See also
Communes of the Seine-Maritime department

References

External links

Official commune website 

Communes of Seine-Maritime
Seine-Maritime communes articles needing translation from French Wikipedia